Rev. Robert Ernest Vinson (November 4, 1876 – September 2, 1945) was president of the University of Texas at Austin from 1916 to 1923. He was president of Western Reserve University, now Case Western Reserve University, from 1923 to 1933.

Biography
He was born on November 4, 1876 in White Oak, South Carolina to  John Vinson (1845–1917) and Mary Elizabeth Brice (1843–1895). He earned a bachelor's degree from Austin College in 1896. He earned a divinity degree from Union Theological Seminary in Virginia in 1899. In 1902 he attended the University of Chicago in Illinois.

He was president of the University of Texas at Austin from 1916 to 1923. He was president of Case Western Reserve University from 1923 to 1933. He died on September 2, 1945. He was buried in West Hill Cemetery in Sherman, Texas.

See also
List of University of Texas at Austin presidents

References

External links

1876 births
1945 deaths
Presidents of the University of Texas at Austin
Presidents of Case Western Reserve University
University of Chicago alumni
Austin College alumni